The Bernard V. Fultz Center for Higher Education otherwise known as the Meigs Center is the University of Rio Grande/Rio Grande Community College's branch in Meigs County, Ohio.

Old building
In 1998, as part of the university's objectives to expand, a small branch in Middleport, Ohio was set up to reach out to the community and to help people who wanted to go to Rio but did not want to commute all the way to the main campus in Rio Grande, Ohio.

While the building did help people not wanting to drive all the way to main campus, the center was too small to hold main classes and so in 2002 the university began looking for a site for a new center.

Current building
In 2002, ideas for a new center arose and were discussed between university officials, Meigs county commissioners, and Meigs local school officials. Groundbreaking began in 2007 and the new building was completed in 2008.

External links
Meigs Center website 

University of Rio Grande